SWestrans (The South West of Scotland Transport Partnership) is a group set up by Transport Scotland to determine and deliver better transport, both locally and nationally, and to act as a catalyst for regeneration of the region's economy. There are six other similar groups covering the rest of Scotland which were created under the Transport (Scotland) Act 2005. SWestrans covers the Dumfries & Galloway council area.

Effectively part of Dumfries and Galloway Council, SWestrans is officially labelled as a Statutory regional transport partnership. It makes plans, through its Regional Transport Strategy then lobbies the various government departments that are responsible for the Scottish Transport network and takes decisions devolved on transport policy for the council.

Currently SWestrans is developing strategies for Road, Rail, Ferry, Bus, Cycling, Walking and Freight.  The Swestrans area is a strategic part of Scotland, with access by road & rail to England, and access by ferry to Ireland.

External links

References 

Transport in Scotland
Transport in Dumfries and Galloway
Regional Transport Partnerships in Scotland